The Battle of Farrukhnagar took place between Suraj Mal and Baloch ruler Musa Khan. Dalil Khan was succeeded by Kamgar Khan and Musa Khan, in whose time the principality fell into the hands of Suraj Mal, the Jat ruler of Bharatpur State, who incorporated it into Hariana around 1763. His son's Jawahar Singh, Nawal Singh, and Ranjit Singh, held it in succession and called it Farrukhnagar.

References

Bharatpur, Rajasthan
History of India
Battles involving the Jats